Berkshire County Cricket Club is one of twenty National county clubs within the domestic cricket structure of England and Wales. It represents the historic county of Berkshire.

The team is currently a member of the National Counties Championship Western Division and plays in the NCCA Knockout Trophy. Berkshire played List A matches occasionally until 2005 but is not classified as a List A team per se.

History
According to Rowland Bowen in his Growth and Development of Cricket, the first reference to cricket being played in the county of Berkshire was in 1751. Cricket certainly reached Berkshire much earlier than that for it originated on the Weald in Saxon or Norman times and was definitely being played in Berkshire's neighbouring county of Surrey in 1550.

The first definite mention of cricket in Berkshire relates to the famous all rounder Thomas Waymark who resided at Bray Wick, near Maidenhead in the 1740s, though there are earlier mentions of the game at Eton College. The first definite mention of cricket in Berkshire relates to a team called "Buckinghamshire, Berkshire & Hertfordshire" in September 1740, which played two matches against London Cricket Club at Uxbridge and the Artillery Ground. London won the first "with great difficulty" but no post-match report was found of the second. See H. T. Waghorn: Cricket Scores 1730–73.

By the late 18th century, Berkshire had achieved first-class status. Its strength was in the prominent Old Field Club of Bray, near Maidenhead, which had a team representative of Berkshire as a county and was capable of taking on other leading teams of the time. The first time Berkshire is recorded as a county team is in a match against Surrey in June 1769 and the county was top-class from then until August 1795 when, after losing to MCC at Lord's, it abruptly ceased to appear in first-class matches.

Club origins 
The Oldfield Club was effectively a Berkshire county team but it was not formally constituted as a county club. Rowland Bowen's researches discovered evidence of a county organisation by 1841, but it may only have been a loose association of local clubs, as was sometimes the case elsewhere.

Berkshire CCC was founded on 17 March 1895, the same year that the Minor Counties Championship began. It did not compete in the first year of the competition but joined for 1896.

Current squad
 * denotes the team captain
  denotes players who have played first-class cricket.

Squad information correct as of 14 February 2019

Notable players

International
This list includes those Berkshire players who have played in Test cricket since 1877, One Day International cricket since 1971, or a Twenty20 International since 2004.

England 

 Danny Briggs
 Percy Chapman
 Tom Dollery
 John Emburey
 Aftab Habib
 Alan Igglesden
 Richard Johnson
 Peter May
 Albert Relf
 Graham Roope
 Shaun Udal

Netherlands 

 Billy Stelling

South Africa 

 Charl Willoughby

West Indies 

 Jimmy Adams

Other

Honours
 Minor Counties Championship (8) - 1924, 1928, 1953, 2008, 2016, 2017, 2018, 2019
 MCCA Knockout Trophy (5) – 2004, 2011, 2013, 2017, 2019

Grounds

See also 
Berkshire county cricket teams

References

External links
 Berkshire CCC website
 Minor Counties CA website

Further reading
 Rowland Bowen, Cricket: A History of its Growth and Development, Eyre & Spottiswoode, 1970
 G. B. Buckley, Fresh Light on 18th Century Cricket, Cotterell, 1935
 E. W. Swanton (editor), Barclays World of Cricket, Guild, 1986
 H. T. Waghorn, The Dawn of Cricket, Electric Press, 1906

 
National Counties cricket
History of Berkshire
Cricket clubs established in 1895
Cricket in Berkshire
1895 establishments in England